Arthemesia was a Finnish black metal band active between 1994 and 2010. The band derives their name from Artemisia absinthium, Latin for wormwood, thought to have many spiritual qualities. Their music mainly concerns a projection of the band's philosophy, namely glorification of the occult and Satanism, but also nature and Shamanism.

The band was formed in 1994, originally under the name Celestial Agony, by vocalist Valtias Mustatuuli and guitarist Routa, but did not record their first demo until 1998, by which time the band included Jari "Arbaal" Mäenpää (guitar), Jukka-Pekka Miettinen (bass), and Oliver Fokin (drums). The band's first album, Devs Iratvs was compiled from several demos they had recorded prior to its release in 2001. A first proper studio album, ShamaNatahs, was released in 2004. Mäenpää  left to form a new band named Wintersun.

Former members 
Valtias Mustatuuli – Vocals
Jukka-Pekka Miettinen (Mor Voryon) – Guitars, Keyboards, Backing Clean Vocals (ex-Ensiferum)
S.M. NekroC – Guitars (see De Lirium's Order)
Magistra Nocte – Keyboards, backing vocals
Erzebeth Meggadeath – Drums (see Moonsorrow)
Routa – Guitars/Keyboards (Finntroll)
Kimmo Miettinen (Mor Vethor) – Drums (ex-Cadacross, ex-Ensiferum)
Jari Mäenpää (Arbaal) – Guitars, keyboard, vocals (see Wintersun, ex-Ensiferum)
Kai Hahto (Dr. KH) – Drums (see Wintersun, Swallow the Sun, ex-Rotten Sound)
Janne Leinonen (G'thaur) – Bass (see Barathrum)
Oliver Fokin – Drums (ex-Ensiferum)
Aconitum – Bass

Discography

Demos
Demo '98 (1998)
The Archaic Dreamer (1999)
Promon02AB (2002)
ShamaNatahS (2006)
The Hyperion Elements (2007)

Albums
Devs Iratvs (15 February 2001)
 "Blade Circle" – 4:01	
 "Universal Black" – 5:27	
 "The Breeze of Grief" – 4:30	
 "Draconis Infernvs" – 4:16	
 "Ancestor of Magick" – 4:51	
 "Lifemocker" – 4:17	
 "Heaven Ablaze" – 3:17	
 "Celebration of the Heaven Lost" – 5:44	
 "Whore of the Satan's Night" – 10:33	
a.O.a. (4 March 2009)
 "Of the Owls, of the Wolves and of the Nature: Revisiting the Microcosm (pt. I)" – 3:00	
 "Valkoinen Susi" – 8:25	
 "Patheme" – 13:08	
 "a.O.a." – 6:57	
 "The Noble Elements" – 10:20	
 "Liber Omega (& The Macrocosm Manifest III)" – 9:54

References

External links
Official Website
[ Allmusic]

Finnish musical groups
Finnish heavy metal musical groups
Finnish black metal musical groups
Symphonic black metal musical groups
Musical groups established in 1994
Musical groups disestablished in 2010
Musical quintets
1994 establishments in Finland